Bruno Ernandes da Silva Lemos (born 1 July 1999), known as Bruno Ernandes, is a Brazilian professional footballer who plays as a centre-forward for Brazilian club São Gonçalo EC.

References

External links
 
 

1999 births
Living people
Footballers from Rio de Janeiro (city)
Brazilian footballers
Association football forwards
Cuiabá Esporte Clube players
Azuriz Futebol Clube players
FC Hirnyk-Sport Horishni Plavni players
União Recreativa dos Trabalhadores players
Ukrainian First League players
Campeonato Paranaense players
Campeonato Brasileiro Série D players
Brazilian expatriate footballers
Expatriate footballers in Ukraine
Brazilian expatriate sportspeople in Ukraine